Dmitriy Aleksandrovich Shokin (born 30 May 1992) is an Uzbekistani heavyweight taekwondo competitor. He won the world championships in 2015 and the Asian championships in 2014 and 2016. Shokin placed fifth at the 2016 Olympics and second at the 2014 and 2018 Asian Games.

Shokin took up taekwondo aged seven. He has a degree in tourism from the Tashkent State University of Economics.

References

External links
 

1992 births
Living people
Uzbekistani male taekwondo practitioners
Olympic taekwondo practitioners of Uzbekistan
Taekwondo practitioners at the 2016 Summer Olympics
Universiade medalists in taekwondo
Taekwondo practitioners at the 2014 Asian Games
Asian Games medalists in taekwondo
Asian Games silver medalists for Uzbekistan
Medalists at the 2014 Asian Games
Taekwondo practitioners at the 2018 Asian Games
Medalists at the 2018 Asian Games
Universiade gold medalists for Uzbekistan
World Taekwondo Championships medalists
Asian Taekwondo Championships medalists
Medalists at the 2015 Summer Universiade
21st-century Uzbekistani people